Jerry Taihuttu (born 29 January 1970) is a Dutch former professional footballer who played as a striker.

Active between 1985 and 2002, Taihuttu made over 200 appearances in Dutch football for six clubs, scoring nearly 100 goals. He also spent time playing professional football in Austria.

Club career
Born in Venlo, Taihuttu began his professional career in 1985-86 with hometown club VVV-Venlo. He moved to Fortuna Sittard in 1989, and after spending part of 1992 on loan at Helmond Sport, signed permanently for that club in 1994. Taihuttu moved to TOP Oss in 1996, and finished his career with one-year spells at Helmond Sport, MVV, BSV Bad Bleiberg of Austria, and FC Eindhoven.

Personal life
His elder brother John Taihuttu also played professionally.

External links
 Voetbal International
 Cv Jerry Taihuttu

1970 births
Living people
Footballers from Venlo
Association football forwards
Dutch footballers
VVV-Venlo players
Fortuna Sittard players
Helmond Sport players
TOP Oss players
MVV Maastricht players
BSV Bad Bleiberg players
FC Eindhoven players
Expatriate footballers in Austria
Eredivisie players
Eerste Divisie players
Dutch people of Moluccan descent
Dutch people of Indonesian descent
Dutch expatriate sportspeople in Austria
Dutch expatriate footballers